Satylghan ibn Nur Daulat was the fourth ruler of the Qasim Khanate.  he was preceded by his father Nur Daulat ibn Haji Girai
and followed by his younger brother Janai. He was the second Qasim ruler of the Giray dynasty which came from Crimea and was the first to have the title of Sultan. He fought the Great Horde in 1491 and Kazan in 1505. In 1501–1503 he was imprisoned in Russia.

References

Qasim Khanate
15th-century monarchs in Europe
Year of birth unknown
Year of death unknown